Anderson and Wise was a performing duo from New Zealand. They were also composers, whose songs were recorded by Nash Chase, The Rumour, Quincy Conserve, and Kamahl.

Background
Originally from Wellington, they were a duo consisting of Ted Taptiklis and Tony Kaye.
In November 1972, after six weeks of semi-finals, along with Andy Waretini, Steve Gilpin, and Shona Laing, they were among the seven contestants selected for the finals. In 1973, their single "Quiet song" bw "Quiet Song" was released on the Ode label. In July 1973, they were the winners in the second songwriting section with their composition "The Boy From Dundee".

Later years
Around the mid 1980s, Kaye recorded some material with a group called Jonahs.
In later years Taptiklis formed Storymaker Partners in the United Kingdom. He is also the author of Unmanaging: Opening up the Organization to its Own Unspoken Knowledge , which was published by Palgrave Macmillan in 2008.

Other artists covering
"Anderson And Wise" was covered by Nash Chase, and in 1972, it was an APRA Silver Scroll nominated song.

In 1973, as part of the Commonwealth Games pop tune competition, their composition  "The Boy From Dundee", performed by Kamahl on Programme 4 of the comp. It was competing against "Country Spring" by Larry Philip, "Take My Life" by Desna Sisarich, "Natural Man by Bunny Walters, "What Do You Do" by Lutha, and "Games Spirit" by Nash Chase. On Programme 6, their other comp Quiet Song by "Anderson & Wise", performed by The Rumour, was up against songs sung by Ray Columbus, Deane Waretini, Steve Allen and Steve Gilpin. "Join Together" by Steve Allen was the winner. Their two songs, "A Quiet Song" performed by The Rumour and "The Boy From Dundee", performed by Kamahl appeared on the 20 Studio One Hits Volume 2 various artists compilation.  Kamahl's version of "The Boy From Dundee" entered the charts in August 1973. It stayed on the charts for four weeks, peaking at no 12, holding that position for two weeks.

In 1974, their composition, "Epistolary" was the B side of single by Quincy Conserve. It was released on the Ode label. The following year it was released in Australia on Warner Brothers. Tony Kaye produced both sides of the release. It was also an APRA Silver Scroll nominated song for 1975.

"Yo Yo Mac" appeared on Reality Show, which was the third album by the Whanganui blues band, Blues Buffett. The album which was released in 2015 featured compositions by the band. "Yo Yo Mac" was the only song not composed by the band's members.

Discography

References

Pop music duos
New Zealand musical duos
1970s in New Zealand music
Male musical duos
Rock music duos
Songwriting teams